Unedogemmula hanseata is an extinct species of sea snail, a marine gastropod mollusk in the family Turridae, the turrids.

Description
The length of the shell attains 23 mm.

Distribution
This extinct marine species was found in Miocene strata in Belgium.

References

 Kautsky, Fritz. "Das Miozän von Hemmoor und Basbeck-Osten." (1925).

External links
 fossilshells.nl: Unedogemmula boreoturricula

hanseata
Gastropods described in 1925